Amauropelta is a genus of ferns in the family Thelypteridaceae, subfamily Thelypteridoideae, in the Pteridophyte Phylogeny Group classification of 2016 (PPG I). Other sources sink the genus into a very broadly defined genus Thelypteris.

Species
, the Checklist of Ferns and Lycophytes of the World accepted the following species:

Amauropelta abbottiana (Maxon) comb. ined.
Amauropelta achalensis (Hieron.) Salino & T.E.Almeida
Amauropelta aculeata (A.R.Sm.) Salino & T.E.Almeida
Amauropelta acunae (C.Sánchez & Zavaro) Salino & T.E.Almeida
Amauropelta aequatorialis (Copel.) comb. ined.
Amauropelta aliena (C.Chr.) Salino & T.E.Almeida
Amauropelta altitudinis (Ponce) Salino & T.E.Almeida
Amauropelta amambayensis (Ponce) Salino & T.E.Almeida
Amauropelta amphioxypteris (Sodiro) Salino & T.E.Almeida
Amauropelta andicola (A.R.Sm.) Salino & T.E.Almeida
Amauropelta appressa (A.R.Sm.) Salino & T.E.Almeida
Amauropelta araucariensis (Ponce) Salino & T.E.Almeida
Amauropelta arborea (Brause) A.R.Sm.
Amauropelta arenosa (A.R.Sm.) A.R.Sm.
Amauropelta argentina (Hieron.) Salino & T.E.Almeida
Amauropelta arrecta (A.R.Sm.) Salino & T.E.Almeida
Amauropelta aspidioides (Willd.) Pic.Serm.
Amauropelta atrorubens (Mett. ex Kuhn) Salino & T.E.Almeida
Amauropelta atrovirens (C.Chr.) Salino & T.E.Almeida
Amauropelta aymarae (A.R.Sm. & M.Kessler) Salino & T.E.Almeida
Amauropelta balbisii (Spreng.) A.R.Sm.
Amauropelta baniensis (Rosenst.) comb. ined.
Amauropelta barvae (A.R.Sm.) Salino & T.E.Almeida
Amauropelta basisceletica (C.Sánchez, Caluff & O.Alvarez) Salino & T.E.Almeida
Amauropelta bergiana (Schltdl.) Holttum
Amauropelta binervata (A.R.Sm.) A.R.Sm.
Amauropelta blepharis (A.R.Sm.) comb. ined.
Amauropelta boliviana A.R.Sm.
Amauropelta bonapartii (Rosenst.) Salino & T.E.Almeida
Amauropelta brachypoda (Baker) A.R.Sm.
Amauropelta brachypus (Sodiro) Salino & T.E.Almeida
Amauropelta brausei (Hieron.) A.R.Sm.
Amauropelta breutelii Kunze
Amauropelta browniana (Ponce) comb. ined.
Amauropelta burkartii (Abbiatti) Salino & T.E.Almeida
Amauropelta campii (A.R.Sm.) Salino & T.E.Almeida
Amauropelta canadasii (Sodiro) Salino & T.E.Almeida
Amauropelta caucaensis (Hieron.) A.R.Sm.
Amauropelta chaparensis (A.R.Sm. & M.Kessler) Salino & T.E.Almeida
Amauropelta cheilanthoides (Kunze) Á.Löve & D.Löve
Amauropelta chimboracensis (A.R.Sm.) comb. ined.
Amauropelta chiriquiana (A.R.Sm.) Salino & T.E.Almeida
Amauropelta christensenii (Christ) Salino & T.E.Almeida
Amauropelta cinerea (Sodiro) A.R.Sm.
Amauropelta cochaensis (C.Chr.) Salino & T.E.Almeida
Amauropelta cocos (A.R.Sm. & Lellinger) Salino & T.E.Almeida
Amauropelta comptula (A.R.Sm.) Salino & T.E.Almeida
Amauropelta concinna (Willd.) Pic.Serm.
Amauropelta conformis (Sodiro) Salino & T.E.Almeida
Amauropelta consanguinea (Fée) Salino & T.E.Almeida
Amauropelta cooleyi (Proctor) Salino & T.E.Almeida
Amauropelta corazonensis (Baker) Salino & T.E.Almeida
Amauropelta cornuta (Maxon) Salino & T.E.Almeida
Amauropelta correllii (A.R.Sm.) Salino & T.E.Almeida
Amauropelta crassiuscula (C.Chr. & Maxon) Salino & T.E.Almeida
Amauropelta ctenitoides (A.R.Sm.) Salino & T.E.Almeida
Amauropelta decrescens (Proctor) Salino & T.E.Almeida
Amauropelta decurtata (Link) Salino & T.E.Almeida
Amauropelta deflectens (C.Chr.) Salino & T.E.Almeida
Amauropelta deflexa (C.Presl) Á.Löve & D.Löve
Amauropelta delasotae (A.R.Sm. & Lellinger) Salino & T.E.Almeida
Amauropelta demerarana (Baker) Boudrie & Cremers
Amauropelta demissa (A.R.Sm.) Salino & T.E.Almeida
Amauropelta denudata (C.Sánchez & Caluff) Salino & T.E.Almeida
Amauropelta depilata (A.R.Sm.) comb. ined.
Amauropelta dodsonii (A.R.Sm.) Salino & T.E.Almeida
Amauropelta dudleyi (A.R.Sm.) Salino & T.E.Almeida
Amauropelta elegantula (Sodiro) Salino & T.E.Almeida
Amauropelta enigmatica (A.R.Sm.) Salino & T.E.Almeida
Amauropelta eriosorus (Fée) Salino & T.E.Almeida
Amauropelta euchlora (Sodiro) A.R.Sm.
Amauropelta euthythrix (A.R.Sm.) Salino & T.E.Almeida
Amauropelta exuta (A.R.Sm.) Salino & T.E.Almeida
Amauropelta fasciola (A.R.Sm. & M.Kessler) Salino & T.E.Almeida
Amauropelta fayorum (A.R.Sm. & M.Kessler) Salino & T.E.Almeida
Amauropelta firma (Baker ex Jenman) Salino & T.E.Almeida
Amauropelta fluminalis (A.R.Sm.) Salino & T.E.Almeida
Amauropelta frigida (Christ) A.R.Sm.
Amauropelta funckii (Mett.) A.R.Sm.
Amauropelta furfuracea (A.R.Sm.) Salino & T.E.Almeida
Amauropelta furva (Maxon) Salino & T.E.Almeida
Amauropelta germaniana (Fée) Salino & T.E.Almeida
Amauropelta glabrescens A.R.Sm.
Amauropelta glandulosolanosa (C.Chr.) Salino & T.E.Almeida
Amauropelta globulifera (Brack.) Holttum
Amauropelta glutinosa (C.Chr.) Salino & T.E.Almeida
Amauropelta gomeziana (A.R.Sm. & Lellinger) Salino & T.E.Almeida
Amauropelta gracilenta (Jenman) Salino & T.E.Almeida
Amauropelta gracilis (Heward) A.R.Sm.
Amauropelta grantii (Copel.) Holttum
Amauropelta grayumii (A.R.Sm.) Salino & T.E.Almeida
Amauropelta gymnosora (Ponce) comb. ined.
Amauropelta harrisii (Proctor) Salino & T.E.Almeida
Amauropelta hastiloba (C.Chr.) Salino & T.E.Almeida
Amauropelta heimeri (C.Chr.) Salino & T.E.Almeida
Amauropelta heteroclita (Desv.) Pic.Serm.
Amauropelta heteroptera (Desv.) Holttum
Amauropelta hutchisonii (A.R.Sm.) Salino & T.E.Almeida
Amauropelta hydrophila (Fée) Salino & T.E.Almeida
Amauropelta illicita (Christ) Salino & T.E.Almeida
Amauropelta inabonensis (Proctor) Salino & T.E.Almeida
Amauropelta inaequans (C.Chr.) Salino & T.E.Almeida
Amauropelta inaequilateralis (A.R.Sm. & M.Kessler) Salino & T.E.Almeida
Amauropelta insignis (Mett.) Salino & T.E.Almeida
Amauropelta intromissa (C.Chr.) Salino & T.E.Almeida
Amauropelta ireneae (Brade) Salino & T.E.Almeida
Amauropelta jimenezii (Maxon & C.Chr.) Salino & T.E.Almeida
Amauropelta juergensii (Rosenst.) Salino & T.E.Almeida
Amauropelta jujuyensis (de la Sota) Salino & T.E.Almeida
Amauropelta knysnaensis (N.C.Anthony & Schelpe) Parris
Amauropelta laevigata (Mett. ex Kuhn) Salino & T.E.Almeida
Amauropelta lanceolata A.R.Sm.
Amauropelta leoniae (A.R.Sm.) Salino & T.E.Almeida
Amauropelta lepidula (Hieron.) A.R.Sm.
Amauropelta linkiana (C.Presl) Pic.Serm.
Amauropelta longicaulis (Baker) Salino & T.E.Almeida
Amauropelta longipilosa (Sodiro) Salino & T.E.Almeida
Amauropelta longisora (A.R.Sm.) Salino & T.E.Almeida
Amauropelta loreae (A.R.Sm.) Salino & T.E.Almeida
Amauropelta loretensis (A.R.Sm.) Salino & T.E.Almeida
Amauropelta lumbricoides (A.R.Sm. & M.Kessler) Salino & T.E.Almeida
Amauropelta macra (A.R.Sm.) Salino & T.E.Almeida
Amauropelta madidiensis (A.R.Sm. & M.Kessler) Salino & T.E.Almeida
Amauropelta malangae (C.Chr.) Salino & T.E.Almeida
Amauropelta margaretae (E.D.Br.) Holttum
Amauropelta melanochlaena (C.Chr.) Salino & T.E.Almeida
Amauropelta membranifera (C.Chr.) Holttum
Amauropelta mertensioides (C.Chr.) Salino & T.E.Almeida
Amauropelta metteniana (Ching) Salino & T.E.Almeida
Amauropelta micula (A.R.Sm.) Salino & T.E.Almeida
Amauropelta minima (A.R.Sm. & M.Kessler) Salino & T.E.Almeida
Amauropelta minutula (C.V.Morton) Salino & T.E.Almeida
Amauropelta mombachensis (L.D.Gómez) Salino & T.E.Almeida
Amauropelta moritziana (Urb.) comb. ined.
Amauropelta mortonii (A.R.Sm.) Salino & T.E.Almeida
Amauropelta mosenii (C.Chr.) Salino & T.E.Almeida
Amauropelta mucosa (A.R.Sm.) Á.Löve & D.Löve
Amauropelta muscicola (Proctor) Salino & T.E.Almeida
Amauropelta muzensis (Hieron.) comb. ined.
Amauropelta namaphila (Proctor) Salino & T.E.Almeida
Amauropelta neglecta (Brade & Rosenst.) Salino & T.E.Almeida
Amauropelta negligens (Jenman) Salino & T.E.Almeida
Amauropelta neotropica (L.D.Gómez) comb. ined.
Amauropelta nephelium (A.R.Sm. & M.Kessler) Salino & T.E.Almeida
Amauropelta nimbata (Jenman) comb. ined.
Amauropelta nitens (Desv.) Salino & T.E.Almeida
Amauropelta nockiana (Jenman) Pic.Serm.
Amauropelta novaeana (Brade) Salino & T.E.Almeida
Amauropelta nubicola (de la Sota) Salino & T.E.Almeida
Amauropelta nubigena (A.R.Sm.) Salino & T.E.Almeida
Amauropelta oaxacana (A.R.Sm.) Salino & T.E.Almeida
Amauropelta odontosora (Bonap.) Holttum
Amauropelta oligocarpa (Humb. & Bonpl. ex Willd.) Pic.Serm.
Amauropelta ophiorhizoma (A.R.Sm. & Lellinger) Salino & T.E.Almeida
Amauropelta opposita (M.Vahl) Pic.Serm.
Amauropelta oppositiformis (C.Chr.) Holttum
Amauropelta oviedoae (C.Sánchez & Zavaro) Salino & T.E.Almeida
Amauropelta pachyrhachis (Kunze ex Mett.) Salino & T.E.Almeida
Amauropelta paleacea (A.R.Sm.) Salino & T.E.Almeida
Amauropelta patula (Fée) Salino & T.E.Almeida
Amauropelta pavoniana (Klotzsch) Salino & T.E.Almeida
Amauropelta pelludia (A.R.Sm. & M.Kessler) Salino & T.E.Almeida
Amauropelta peradenia (A.R.Sm.) A.R.Sm.
Amauropelta peruviana (Rosenst.) Salino & T.E.Almeida
Amauropelta phacelothrix (Rosenst.) Salino & T.E.Almeida
Amauropelta physematioides (Kuhn & Christ ex Krug) Salino & T.E.Almeida
Amauropelta piedrensis (C.Chr.) Salino & T.E.Almeida
Amauropelta pilosissima (C.V.Morton) A.R.Sm.
Amauropelta pilosohispida (Hook.) A.R.Sm.
Amauropelta pilosula (Klotzsch & H.Karst. ex Mett.) Á.Löve & D.Löve
Amauropelta pittieri (C.Chr.) comb. ined.
Amauropelta pleiophylla (Sehnem) Salino & T.E.Almeida
Amauropelta podotricha (Sehnem) Salino & T.E.Almeida
Amauropelta proboscidea (A.R.Sm.) Salino & T.E.Almeida
Amauropelta proctorii (A.R.Sm. & Lellinger) A.R.Sm.
Amauropelta prolatipedis (Lellinger) A.R.Sm.
Amauropelta prominula (Christ) C.F.Reed
Amauropelta ptarmica (Kunze ex Mett.) Pic.Serm.
Amauropelta ptarmiciformis (C.Chr. & Rosenst. ex Rosenst.) Salino & T.E.Almeida
Amauropelta pteroidea (Klotzsch) A.R.Sm.
Amauropelta pusilla (Mett.) A.R.Sm.
Amauropelta raddii (Rosenst.) Salino & T.E.Almeida
Amauropelta randallii (Maxon & C.V.Morton ex C.V.Morton) Salino & T.E.Almeida
Amauropelta recumbens (Rosenst.) Salino & T.E.Almeida
Amauropelta reducta (C.Chr.) Salino & T.E.Almeida
Amauropelta regnelliana (C.Chr.) Salino & T.E.Almeida
Amauropelta resinifera (Desv.) Pic.Serm.
Amauropelta retusa (Sw.) Pic.Serm.
Amauropelta rheophyta (Proctor) Salino & T.E.Almeida
Amauropelta rigescens (Sodiro) Salino & T.E.Almeida
Amauropelta riopardensis (Rosenst.) comb. ined.
Amauropelta rioverdensis (C.Chr.) comb. ined.
Amauropelta rivularioides (Fée) Salino & T.E.Almeida
Amauropelta roraimensis (Baker) A.R.Sm.
Amauropelta rosei (Maxon) comb. ined.
Amauropelta rosenstockii (C.Chr.) Salino & T.E.Almeida
Amauropelta rosulata (A.R.Sm. & M.Kessler) Salino & T.E.Almeida
Amauropelta rudiformis (C.Chr.) Salino & T.E.Almeida
Amauropelta rudis (Kunze) Pic.Serm.
Amauropelta rufa (Poir.) Salino & T.E.Almeida
Amauropelta ruiziana (Klotzsch) Salino & T.E.Almeida
Amauropelta rupestris (Klotzsch) A.R.Sm.
Amauropelta rupicola (C.Chr.) Salino & T.E.Almeida
Amauropelta rustica (Fée) Salino & T.E.Almeida
Amauropelta salazica (Holttum) Holttum
Amauropelta sancta (L.) Pic.Serm.
Amauropelta sanctae-catharinae (Rosenst.) Salino & T.E.Almeida
Amauropelta saxicola (Sw.) Salino & T.E.Almeida
Amauropelta scalaris (Christ) Á.Löve & D.Löve
Amauropelta scalpturoides (Fée) Salino & T.E.Almeida
Amauropelta sellensis (C.Chr.) Salino & T.E.Almeida
Amauropelta semilunata (Sodiro) Salino & T.E.Almeida
Amauropelta shaferi (Maxon & C.Chr.) Salino & T.E.Almeida
Amauropelta soridepressa (Salino & V.A.O.Dittrich) Salino & T.E.Almeida
Amauropelta steyermarkii (A.R.Sm.) Salino & T.E.Almeida
Amauropelta stierii (Rosenst.) Salino & T.E.Almeida
Amauropelta straminea (Sodiro) Salino & T.E.Almeida
Amauropelta strigillosa (A.R.Sm. & Lellinger) Salino & T.E.Almeida
Amauropelta strigosa (Willd.) Holttum
Amauropelta struthiopteroides (C.Chr.) Salino & T.E.Almeida
Amauropelta subacrostichoides A.R.Sm.
Amauropelta subscandens (A.R.Sm.) Salino & T.E.Almeida
Amauropelta subtilis (A.R.Sm.) Salino & T.E.Almeida
Amauropelta supina (Sodiro) Salino & T.E.Almeida
Amauropelta supranitens (Christ) Á.Löve & D.Löve
Amauropelta tablana (Christ) Salino & T.E.Almeida
Amauropelta tamandarei (Rosenst.) Salino & T.E.Almeida
Amauropelta tapantensis (A.R.Sm. & Lellinger) Salino & T.E.Almeida
Amauropelta tenerrima (Fée) Salino & T.E.Almeida
Amauropelta thomsonii (Jenman) Pic.Serm.
Amauropelta tomentosa (Thouars) Holttum
Amauropelta trelawniensis (Proctor) Salino & T.E.Almeida
Amauropelta uncinata (A.R.Sm.) Salino & T.E.Almeida
Amauropelta underwoodiana (Maxon) comb. ined.
Amauropelta utanagensis (Hieron.) comb. ined.
Amauropelta vattuonei (Hicken) Salino & T.E.Almeida
Amauropelta venturae (A.R.Sm.) Salino & T.E.Almeida
Amauropelta vernicosa (A.R.Sm. & Lellinger) Salino & T.E.Almeida
Amauropelta villana (L.D.Gómez) Salino & T.E.Almeida
Amauropelta yungensis (A.R.Sm. & M.Kessler) Salino & T.E.Almeida
Amauropelta zurquiana (A.R.Sm. & Lellinger) Salino & T.E.Almeida

References

Thelypteridaceae
Fern genera